Yandyki is a rural locality (a selo) and the administrative center of Yandykovsky Selsoviet, Limansky District, Astrakhan Oblast, Russia. The population was 3,135 as of 2010. There are 15 streets.

Geography 
Yandyki is located 9 km west of Liman (the district's administrative centre) by road. Liman is the nearest rural locality.

References 

Rural localities in Limansky District